Luke Garry Dreher (born 27 November 1998) is an English professional footballer who plays as a midfielder.

Career 
Dreher joined the Crystal Palace academy system at the age of nine and in April 2016, reached the first team squad for the first time as an unused substitute in an away fixture against Manchester United. He was also named as the club's under-18 player of the year in May 2016.

At the start of the 2016–17 season, Dreher was again included in the first-team squad, but then incurred two separate injuries which kept him out of action for almost six months. Upon his return, he was made captain of the Palace under-23 side.

Dreher made his senior debut in a home 5–3 win against Bournemouth on 12 May 2019, as an injury-time substitute for Andros Townsend.

In Summer 2019, Dreher sustained an injury during pre-season training. Despite this, in October, he signed a contract extension until June 2021. He signed a further contract extension in August 2021.

On 26 January 2022, Dreher joined National League side Bromley on loan for the remainder of the 2021–22 season.

Dreher was released by Crystal Palace at the end of the 2021–22 season.

Career statistics

References

External links

1998 births
Living people
Sportspeople from Epsom
Association football midfielders
Crystal Palace F.C. players
Bromley F.C. players
Premier League players
English footballers